Poznań Krzesiny railway station is a railway station serving the Krzesiny neighbourhood of the city of Poznań, in the Greater Poland Voivodeship, Poland. The station is located on the Kluczbork–Poznań railway and Poznań Krzesiny–Kobylnica railway. The train services are operated by Przewozy Regionalne.

Train services
The station is served by the following service(s):

 InterRegio services (IR) Poznań Główny — Ostrów Wielkopolski — Łódź — Warszawa Główna
 Regional services (PR) Łódź Kaliska — Ostrów Wielkopolski — Poznań Główny

References

 This article is based upon a translation of the Polish language version as of July 2016.

External links
 

Krzesiny
Railway stations in Greater Poland Voivodeship
Railway stations served by Przewozy Regionalne InterRegio